The Director-General of Security is the executive officer of the Australian Security Intelligence Organisation (ASIO), Australia's national security agency. The Director-General, through ASIO, has overall responsibility for the protection of the country and its citizens from espionage, sabotage (especially sabotage of critical infrastructure), politically motivated violence, attacks on the Australian defence system, terrorism and acts of foreign interference.

The Director-General is assisted by two Deputy Directors-General, although only one of the former Deputies, David Fricker, has been publicly identified. David Fricker left ASIO in 2011. The Director-General is subject to the directions of the Attorney-General, although convention allows the Director-General direct access to the Prime Minister. The Director-General of Security is often regarded as Australia's 'top spy', even though they may not have been previously engaged in intelligence upon appointment. The incumbent Director-General is Mike Burgess, appointed on 16 September 2019.

The Director-General is appointed by the Governor-General on the advice of the Prime Minister and holds office under the Australian Security Intelligence Organisation Act 1979. The normal term of appointment is limited to seven years, although the Director-General is eligible for reappointment.

Directors-General of Security

See also 
 William Simpson – Director-General of Security in Australia from 1942 to 1945

References

External links

List of Directors-General of Security on the ASIO website

1949 establishments in Australia
Australian Security Intelligence Organisation